Deep Storm is the third solo novel by American author Lincoln Child, published on January 30, 2007. This is the first of Child's novels to introduce Dr. Jeremy Logan, the protagonist of Child's solo works.

Plot summary
In the prologue, three workers – Kevin Lindengood, Fred Hicks, and John Wherry – are operating the rig on the Storm King oil rig in the North Atlantic, off the coast of Greenland. When the equipment begins malfunctioning, Wherry orders everything to be shut down. However, even after Lindengood shuts off the electromagnet, a series of strange signals are still being transmitted to their devices.

Twenty months later, Former naval doctor Peter Crane is sent to investigate a mysterious illness that has broken out on the rig. He meets Dr. Howard Asher, who hints at a fantastic secret being discovered. Government officials transport him to a massive, 12-level facility run by the United States military. He receives a confidential envelope that explains how the military has discovered Atlantis. As he is brought down into the facility, codenamed Deep Storm, he discovers that nearly a quarter of the staff have been acting strangely within the last few weeks. Working alongside the psychiatrist Dr. Roger Corbett and the chief military doctor Michele Bishop, Crane is witness to one of these incidents; a worker named Randall Waite suddenly grabs a hostage after screaming about "voices" in his head, then eventually stabs himself in the neck with a screwdriver. After interviewing some of the patients there, and finding many of the symptoms including sleeplessness, lack of focus, nausea, and psychological effects such as changes in personality, Crane realizes that there must be some kind of unifying basis to all of them.

Meanwhile, Asher talks with the military commander in charge of Deep Storm, Admiral Spartan, and his second-in-command, Commander Terrence Korolis. Asher thinks that Crane should have the right to go down to the “classified” levels, levels 6 through 1, to investigate the cause of the sickness,  After this, the base is set on alert after a pinhole breach in one of the corridors. The officers determine it was an act of sabotage and Asher reminds all of the heads of departments to be vigilant, while Korolis brings in a team of black ops soldiers, who answer directly to him rather than Spartan, to reinforce security. Asher also shows Crane several "sentinels" that they have found: cube-shaped objects with a texture that seems to consist of every color known to man, and emit thin beams of light straight up, and gravitate to the center of any room or container they are kept in. Asher tells him that this is actually not a solid beam of light, but a pulse sending out a mini signal in binary code.  He further goes on to say that he hired his personal cryptographer, Joseph Marris, to analyze this binary code since he believes that this technology is not meant for humans. Admiral Spartan and his forces come in at this instant and, much to Crane's surprise, give him clearance to visit the entire facility.  Crane goes down and meets Hui Ping, a doctor who is also trying to analyze the beams of light. Ping and Crane also agree to leave no stone unturned and check for any kind of similarity all the patients may have.

Meanwhile, back on the mainland, Lindengood gets in contact with a man named Wallace, who represents a shadowy organization that has taken a great interest in the discovery after Lindengood provides them with certain information. However, unbeknownst to him, they plan to simply destroy whatever is down there. When Lindengood demands an increased pay for his information, Wallace kills him and flees to Storm King, working undercover as a crew member and regularly shipping supplies to a fellow insider on Deep Storm.

A few days later, Asher reaches a breakthrough with the binomial code, and realizes that it is a mathematical expression: 1 divided by 0. A while later, after Crane mistakenly handles a sentinel with his bare hand, Asher excitedly describes how the sentinel's broadcasts are now more clear, and they can now analyze messages on the infra-red spectrum, radioactive spectrum, and any other kind of measuring device know to man. However, during this exchange, Peter notices how Asher has a very pale complexion and bruising along his arm.  He requests that Asher go to medical, but Asher disagrees, saying that he could spend time in the Hyperbaric chamber as a way to alleviate his illness for a short time, just until they decode the rest of the messages coming from the sentinel. At this point, Crane runs a brain scan on all of the patients and discovers that they all do have something in common; all of their brain waves spike in formation, even their theta waves. He realizes that this is another signal coming from the source.  He also realizes the implications, that whoever made this technology is much more powerful than humans. He is about to tell Asher of his discovery when Asher phones him saying that he decoded all of the messages. However, upon his arrival at the Hyperbaric chamber, the saboteur has struck again, burning the Hyperbaric chamber with Asher and Marris both inside. Asher is nearly dead but manages to say one word to Crane before he dies: Whip.  Along with Ping, Crane does not realize what this means, but then figures out that they could possibly salvage the hard drive and look at the decoded messages from Asher's laptop. However, Commander Korolis records the conversation and hurriedly runs a degaussing magnet over the hard drive, erasing it. He notices how Asher did not want to continue with the digging, and assumes that whatever is on the hard drive is not relevant and would halt America from recovering possibly beneficial technology.

Korolis subsequently frames Ping as the saboteur, forcing Crane and Ping into hiding as they decipher Asher's hard drive. They go to a deserted physics lab and realize that the hard drive was magnetized. Because humans place passive and active ways to warn people of the danger of such stored weapons, Crane assumes aliens think the same way and the sentinels are actually a message warning advanced civilizations to stay off earth. This deciphers the mathematical expressions because the "forbidden" mathematical maneuvers are the only way aliens can communicate with other more sophisticated races.

Crane leaves Ping and goes to warn Spartan of this danger. Spartan initially does not seem to take the hint, and still believes that there is beneficial technology there. Frustrated, Crane goes to Dr. Bishop and asks her to organize the other heads of departments into believing him. Bishop promises to call him back but is discovered by Dr. Corbett an hour later in the Environmental Control section, wiring C-4 into the facility's wall.  Corbett secretly switches on his phone, dials his intern, and confronts Bishop. She does not deny it, instead revealing that she is a radical with anti-American ideals, and how she believes that America has no right to take this technology. She shoots him with a silenced pistol and quickly leaves at the sound of approaching voices. Corbett is barely alive, and starts to disable the C4, but Bishop re-enters the room and finds him. In his panic, he accidentally activates the fourth and final detonator, killing himself and Bishop and blowing open the facility wall. The resulting leak floods all of level 8 and half of level 7.

Meanwhile, Spartan tells Korolis about how Crane's advice does make sense, and he is going to call for an investigation before starting the drilling again. Korolis, determined to acquire the technology no matter what, and believing that Spartan has become infected with the disease, knocks Spartan unconscious, locks him in his quarters, and assumes command.

Crane and Ping meet with Dr. Gene Vanderbilt, the ranking science officer of levels 8 through 12, and he orders a mass evacuation of all personnel on levels 9 through 12, as those on level 8 and below (including Korolis) are stranded by the flood. They round up all 112 people on the higher levels and begin the evacuation process.  A single black ops soldier arrives at the ladder to the escape pod as the group begins to escape, and he orders them to return to their stations.  A wounded Spartan then appears and guns the soldier down, ordering everyone to evacuate while he stays behind to fend off any other approaching soldiers. He gives Crane the card of his contact in Washington, simply named McPherson, and tells Crane to tell McPherson everything. During this time, Ping manages to decode another of the warnings which suggests that uncovering the weapons could destroy the solar system. The survivors manage to launch the escape pod shortly before Korolis and his men discover a fantastic weapons cache of stable orbiting black holes. Before they can investigate further, a blast that is presumed to be one of the active countermeasures is fired, consuming the drill team and Deep Storm.

In the epilogue several months later, a small salvaging operation of various wreckage from Deep Storm is underway, and the other insider from the Storm King platform, Wallace, has been arrested. Crane and Ping have met up with McPherson, and Crane tells McPherson the entire story. They listen to a recorded tape of Korolis before his death, and agree not to tell anyone of this discovery, as no one was meant to access such powerful weapons. Crane reasons that whoever put the sentinels there were also cautious enough to provide obvious warning signals, as evident by the impossible mathematic equations. However, McPherson raises two disturbing points: The aliens more than likely consider humans to be negligible due to their primitive technology, hence the violent placing of the devices in the earth as recounted by Albarn 600 years ago; and also that humans at least deactivate weapons before storing them, but because the aliens did not attempt this at all, McPherson thinks that this is not a waste dump at all; it is an active storage facility of weapons for future use.

References

2007 American novels
Novels by Lincoln Child
American thriller novels
2007 science fiction novels
Atlantis in fiction
Doubleday (publisher) books
Underwater novels